Pavlos Kagialis (born 17 July 1984) is a Greek competitive sailor.

He competed at the 2016 Summer Olympics in Rio de Janeiro, in the men's 470 taking the third place, along with Panagiotis Mantis.

Kagialis and Mantis won the bronze medal at the 470 World Championships in 2013, and the couple again took the third place at the 2014 World Championships in Santander. They were second at the 2013 Mediterranean Games in Mersin.

At the 2020 Summer Olympics, in Tokyo, he participated along with Mantis and took the eighth place.

References

External links
 

1984 births
Living people
Greek male sailors (sport)
Olympic sailors of Greece
Sailors at the 2016 Summer Olympics – 470
Olympic bronze medalists for Greece
Olympic medalists in sailing
Medalists at the 2016 Summer Olympics
Mediterranean Games silver medalists for Greece
Competitors at the 2013 Mediterranean Games
Mediterranean Games medalists in sailing
Sailors at the 2020 Summer Olympics – 470
People from Chalkidiki
Sportspeople from Central Macedonia